is a Japanese illustrator, picture book writer, and manga artist. His avant-garde comics are characterized by non-sequiturs and absurd imagery, being called "anti-manga".

Life and work 
Sasaki was born in 1946, on the outskirts of Kobe, from a poor background. His parents ran a printing studio. He studied art at  Kyoto City University of Arts, but dropped out, unable to afford the required art materials. 

Sasaki admired the nonsense works of manga artist Shigeru Sugiura and the underground magazine Garo. In 1966, Sasaki made his debut as a manga artist with "Yoku Aru Hanashi", published in Garo. He did other stories for the same magazine, such as the 1967 one-shot "Tengoku De Miru Yume".

Since 1973 Sasaki left manga to write and draw picture books, having published titles such as "Yappari Okami" and the "Monsieur Meuniere" series. Sasaki also illustrated book covers, among them some of the original editions of the early Haruki Murakami works.

References

External links 
 A catalog of Sasaki's works 

1946 births
Living people
Manga artists from Hyōgo Prefecture